Vladimir Loginov may refer to:

Vladimir Loginov (footballer), (born 1974), retired Kazakhstan football forward
Vladimir Loginov (ice hockey) (born 1981), Russian ice hockey player 
Vladimir Loginov (revolutionary) (1897–1937), Russian revolutionary 
Vladimir Loginov (politician) (1954–2016), Russian politician, governor of Koryak Autonomous Okrug (2000–2005)